Vinay Pathak (born 12 July 1968) is an Indian theater and film actor. He has starred in many films including Khosla Ka Ghosla, Bheja Fry, Island City and Johnny Gaddaar and had a supporting role in movies like Jism, Rab Ne Bana Di Jodi, and My Name is Khan.Early life
Pathak was born in Bhojpur district, Bihar, India.Mr. Pathak spends childhood early day in Dhanbad as his father was posted in police department.  He attended the boarding school Vikas Vidyalaya, Ranchi until 1982. After graduating from Allahabad University he moved to United States for higher studies. Perhaps chief among his mentors in his BFA program Stony Brook University was Farley Richmond, who also urged him to return to India and Hindi theater and film in 1995.

Career
While studying at State University of New York at Stony Brook Pathak had many acting roles, notably in the comedies Khosla Ka Ghosla and Bheja Fry. In 1999, he played the role of Vinny in the television series Hip Hip Hurray. He also produced the film Dasvidaniya, which told the story of a common man bidding farewell before dying.

Along with good friend Ranvir Shorey, he anchored the show OYE. Together they hosted the talk show Ranvir Vinay Aur Kaun?., as well as House Arrest, Duniya Goal Hain and Cricket Crazy. He also teamed up with his friends Ranvir, Suresh Menon, and Gaurav Gera to be a part of a gag-based show The Great Indian Comedy Show.

Pathak starred in a minor role as Inspector Gurpal Badash in a made-for-TV movie Murder Unveiled (2005), featuring the Sikh community in Canada.

Pathak acted in the movies Johnny Gaddaar, Aaja Nachle , Khoya Khoya Chand and Rab Ne Bana Di Jodi.

His next film produced by Pritish Nandy Communications Raat Gayi Baat Gayi, was released in India in December 2009. 

His was in the film Antardwand''.

Personal life
Vinay Pathak is married to Sonika Sahay. The couple have two daughters Vasudha and Sharinee.

Filmography

Television

Films

Producer

Web series

References

External links
 

Stony Brook University alumni
Indian male film actors
Living people
Male actors in Hindi cinema
Indian male television actors
Male actors from Bihar
People from Bihar
Indian male voice actors
1968 births
Zee Cine Awards winners
Indian VJs (media personalities)